Parcelles Assainies is a commune d'arrondissement of the city of Dakar, Senegal. As of 2013 it had a population of 159,498.

See also
 Wolof

References

Arrondissements of Dakar